Maes y Facrell National Nature Reserve sits high above the coastal town of Llandudno on the Great Orme headland, in the county of Conwy, Wales. It commands sweeping views of Conwy Bay, and the mountains of Snowdonia.

Designated a national nature reserve both for its biological and geological interest, it contains a mosaic of flower-rich grassland, and fragments of limestone pavement. There is evidence of past human activity everywhere, and old copper mines are scattered throughout the site.

See also 
 National nature reserves in Wales

National nature reserves in Wales
Nature reserves in Conwy County Borough
Llandudno